The Oxford Area School District is the K-12 public school district for the town of Oxford in Chester County, Pennsylvania. The school's new location was opened in September 2005.

Schools
Jordan Bank Elementary School (Kindergarten)
Elk Ridge Elementary School (Grades 1–2)
Nottingham Elementary School (Grades 3–4)
Hopewell Elementary School (Grades 5–6)
Penn's Grove Middle School (Grades 7–8)
Oxford Area High School (Grades 9–12)

External links
Official website

School districts established in 1878
School districts in Chester County, Pennsylvania
1878 establishments in Pennsylvania